New York Leader may refer to:

 New York Leader (19th century), a New York City weekly literary newspaper from about 1855 to 1871
 New York Call, a daily socialist newspaper briefly renamed the New York Leader before its demise in 1923